The Atlantis Interceptors (also released as Raiders of Atlantis) is a 1983 Italian science fiction film directed by Ruggero Deodato and starring Christopher Connelly, Gioia Scola, Tony King, Michele Soavi and George Hilton.

Synopsis
Two Vietnam veterans and a team of scientists trying to raise a sunken Russian submarine face a battle for survival against Atlanteans.

Cast
 Christopher Connelly as Mike Ross
 Gioia Scola as Dr. Cathy Rollins 
 Tony King as Mohammed / Washington
 Stefano Mingardo as Klaus Nemnez
 Ivan Rassimov as Bill Cook
 Giancarlo Prati as Frank 
 Bruce Baron as Crystal Skull
 George Hilton as Professor Peter Saunders
 Mike Monty as George 
 Michele Soavi as James
 Adriana Giuffrè 
 Maurizio Fardo as Larry Stoddard 
 Lewis E. Ciannelli as Oil Rig Commander

Release
The Atlantis Interceptors was released in 1983.

Reception
In a retrospective review, Donald Guarisco wrote for AllMovie that the film was a "good illustration of just how fun an exploitation quickie can be", not a plot that was described as "throwaway stuff", but that it "offers plentiful b-movie fun in practice because it puts an accent on action, and throws an endless array of endearingly goofy b-movie plot hooks at the viewer." Discussing the effects, Guarisco found them "cheap looking, particularly the miniature effects. . . but that's really part of the fun for the b-movie fans this is aimed at." and concluded that the film was a "b-movie with specialized appeal but Eurocult fans will likely find it to be a blast of kitschy fun."

Footnotes

Sources

External links 
 

1983 science fiction films
1983 films
1980s Italian-language films
English-language Italian films
Films directed by Ruggero Deodato
Italian science fiction films
Films scored by Guido & Maurizio De Angelis
1980s Italian films